The Last Face is a 2016 American drama film directed by Sean Penn and written by Erin Dignam. The film stars Charlize Theron, Javier Bardem, Adèle Exarchopoulos, and Jean Reno. It was selected to compete for the Palme d'Or at the 2016 Cannes Film Festival, debuting to generally poor reviews. The film was released on DirecTV on June 29, 2017, before being released on video on demand and in theaters on July 28, 2017, by Saban Films.

Plot
Wren Peterson is a physician and activist working in West Africa with the organization Doctors of the World that her dead father started so many years ago. She's happy to lead the organization, but frequently finds herself negatively comparing herself to her father's achievements. During 2003 Wren meets Miguel, a handsome surgeon who has also devoted himself to treating people from impoverished and war torn sections of the world. The two fall in love but Wren soon discovers that Miguel has had a prior sexual relationship with her cousin, which contributes to the decay of their relationship.

Cast
 Charlize Theron as Wren Petersen
 Javier Bardem as Miguel Leon
 Adèle Exarchopoulos as Ellen
 Jean Reno as Dr. Love
 Jared Harris as Dr. John Farber
 Sibongile Mlambo as Assatu
 Merritt Wever as Marlee

Production
On April 10, 2014, it was announced Sean Penn would direct the film, with Charlize Theron and Javier Bardem set to star in the film. Principal photography began on August 1, 2014, in Cape Town.

Release

The film premiered at the 2016 Cannes Film Festival on May 20, 2016. On September 8, 2016, Saban Films acquired U.S distribution rights to the film. The film was released on DirecTV on June 29, 2017, before being released on video on demand and in theaters on July 28, 2017, by Saban Films.

Reception
The reception for The Last Face at Cannes was very negative and The Sydney Morning Herald reported that the film was booed during its screening. The film holds a rating of 8% on Rotten Tomatoes, based on 49 reviews, with an average rating of 3/10. The site's critics' consensus reads: "The Last Face's noble intentions are nowhere near enough to carry a fundamentally misguided story that arguably demeans the demographic it wants to defend." On Metacritic, the film has a weighted average score of 16 out of 100, based on 20 critics, indicating "overwhelming dislike".

The Hollywood Reporter panned the film, writing "A backdrop of Third World atrocity, suffering and merciless human-rights violations serves as the canvas for a faux-profound Hollywood love story in Sean Penn's stunningly self-important but numbingly empty cocktail of romance and insulting refugee porn, The Last Face." The Guardian and The Telegraph were equally dismissive, with The Guardian commenting that "Charlize Theron and Javier Bardem give career worst performances as doctors falling in love in west Africa while black characters are relegated to the background".

See also
White savior narrative in film

References

External links
 

2016 films
2016 drama films
2010s English-language films
American drama films
Films directed by Sean Penn
Films scored by Hans Zimmer
Films set in the 2000s
Films set in Liberia
Films set in Sierra Leone
Films shot in South Africa
River Road Entertainment films
Saban Films films
2010s American films